Oskar Magnusson is a Swedish professional ice hockey forward who plays for AIK in HockeyAllsvenskan. He was drafted by the  Washington Capitals in the 7th round of the 2020 NHL Entry Draft with the 211th overall pick.

Career statistics

International

References

External links

2002 births
Living people
AIK IF players
Malmö Redhawks players
People from Trelleborg
Swedish ice hockey forwards
Washington Capitals draft picks
Sportspeople from Skåne County